Cihuatlán is a coastal municipality in the Mexican state of Jalisco. Its main city is also named Cihuatlán.

Etymology
The word Cihuatlán is compounded of two words of Nahuatl origin, a language spoken in central Mexico since the seventh century AD and the language of the Aztecs: Zihua, woman, and Tlán place; therefore in Cihuatlán means place of women.

History

The town was founded on the Marabasco River, and at the time of the Spanish conquest its population was about 500 women and only 20 men. The first Spanish expedition to the Jalisco coastal zone was led by Gonzalo de Sandoval.

By decree of the President of the Republic of Mexico, on December 16, 1825, the harbour Barra de Navidad was rebuilt in order to accommodate local and foreign trade.

Coat of arms 
The Cihuatlán coat of arms is in a French style with cross-sectioning. In the upper left section is the image of a pre-Hispanic woman's head. In the upper right section is a ship sailing on the sea. In the bottom left section is a religious building and in the bottom right section, a view of a fertile valley.

Most important villages 
 Cihuatlán, 15,697 inhabitants (2005)
 Melaque 6,379 inhabitants
 Barra de Navidad 3,386 inhabitants
 Jaluco 2,182 inhabitants
 Emiliano Zapata 1,589 inhabitants

Notable persons born in Cihuatlán

 Nestor Enrique Valencia Guerrero, June 9, 1965, grandson to former municipal president of Cihuatlán, Ramon Valencia Torres, Mayor and Councilmember of the City of Bell, California, USA. First Mayor in the United States that welcomed immigrant children from Honduras, Guatemala, and El Salvador, in 2014. Also, his civic actions for the City of Bell changed government transparency laws.

Government

Municipal presidents

See also
Rudo y Cursi

References

Populated places in Jalisco